Cloverhill Bakery is a producer of baked goods primarily sold through vending machines throughout North America. It also produces the buns used by McDonald's. Cloverhill was founded in Chicago, Illinois, in 1961 as a small family owned vending company that hand-packed pastries. In 1977 the bakery expanded their facilities and implemented an automated Danish baking system. In 2011 Cloverhill opened an additional facility in Cicero, Illinois.  Cloverhill was acquired by Aryzta in 2014. In 2017, an ICE immigration raid on its Chicago facility resulted in the removal 800 workers who were found to be hired and employed without legal documentation. On February 1, 2018, Aryzta announced that it had sold the Big Texas and Cloverhill brands to Hostess Brands.

Product lines
Their products include Danish pastries, cinnamon rolls, crumb cakes, cake doughnuts and honey buns each wrapped for individual sale.  Cloverhill Bakery baked goods are also sold through supermarkets, warehouse clubs and convenience stores.

Cloverhill Bakery is perhaps best known for their production of the Big Texas Cinnamon Roll.  The Big Texas is the 2005, 2006, 2007, 2008 and 2009 Automatic Merchandiser Readers' Choice Pastry of the Year.

In 2011, Cloverhill Bakery was back on top - this time with their Boston Crème Danish, in the New Products category of "Pastry".

External links
Cloverhill Bakery website with product information
2009 Automatic Merchandiser Readers' Choice Products of the Year 
2011 Automatic Merchendiser Readers' Choice Products of the Year

References

Bakeries of the United States
Food and drink companies based in Chicago
Manufacturing companies based in Chicago